CJ CheilJedang Corporation() is a South Korean international food company based in Seoul that manufactures food ingredients, ambient, frozen and chilled packaged food products, pharmaceuticals and biotechnology. Its brands include Bibigo, Gourmet and Hatbahn. Bibigo is well known for Mandu (Korean dumpling) in the global market.

History
CJ Cheil Jedang was founded as 'Cheil Jedang' in August 1953 as a sugar and flour manufacturer and was originally part of Samsung Group, as their first manufacturing business. In July 1993 it spun off from Samsung and gained independent management, changing into a life and culture group with the entrance into the food service and entertainment industries. In 1996 it became the 'Cheil Jedang Group' with the official separation from Samsung Group completed in February 1997.

In October 2002 the CJ Group was launched and the official name changed to 'CJ Co., Ltd'. In September 2007 CJ Co again spun off as a business holding company renamed 'CJ CheilJedang Co., Ltd' and CJ Group became a holding company for a group of food and entertainment-related subsidiaries based in South Korea. It has four main core businesses: Food & Food Service, Bio Pharma, Entertainment Media, and Home Shopping & Logistics; and CJ Cheil Jedang was put under Food & Food Service.

In 2018, CJ CheilJedang acquired Kahiki Foods, an American food manufacturing company based in Columbus, Ohio. In 2019, CJ CheilJedang acquired Schwan’s Company, a food manufacturing company based in Minnesota, United States.

Businesses
Its four main business areas are food ingredients (including sugar, wheat, and oil), food (ambient, chilled and frozen food including HMR products), logistics, and biotechnology (including MSG, lysine), processed food and animal feed.

It has since expanded globally with offices in the U.S., China, Vietnam, Japan, and Germany. CJ packaged food products are currently exported to more than 100 countries. 

CJ was recently reported to be in talks with the US Corporation Dendreon who is in trials with a cancer vaccine called Provenge.

See also
List of South Korean companies

References

External links
 

 
Former Samsung subsidiaries
Sugar companies
Food and drink companies of South Korea
Manufacturing companies based in Seoul
Food and drink companies established in 1953
Companies listed on the Korea Exchange
South Korean brands
South Korean companies established in 1953